Poems on the Underground (POTU) is a project, started in 1986, to bring poetry to a wider audience by displaying various poems on the London Underground rapid transit network and participating websites. Poems on the Underground displays poems by contemporary and classic poets three times a year. POTU also produces booklets free of charge to the public and publishes anthologies.

History
Launched in 1986, the Poems on the Underground programme was the idea of three writers, Judith Chernaik, Gerard Benson, and Cicely Herbert whose aim was to bring poetry to a wider audience. Judith Chernaik, Cicely Herbert, Imtiaz Dharker, and George Szirtes now select poems for inclusion in the programme. London Underground provides space on its fleet of trains, and they and POTU's partners also display the poems on their websites during the duration of the print display. The posters are designed by Tom Davidson.

The first book containing all the featured poems was not published until much later, having been initially rejected by Faber as unlikely to prove commercially viable. In the end, towards the end of the decade, a young Publisher's Representative (salesman) persuaded his employers – Cassell Publishing – to publish the tome when, having failed in his attempt to buy the as-yet non-existent publication as a birthday present for his mother, he felt sufficiently confident of making it a bestseller. He was set a target by the publishing house of selling 5,000 copies by the Christmas following publication, or risk losing his job. But the book – which is still very much in print 27 years later and must rank as one of the best-selling poetry books of all time – immediately sold out and went straight to reprint prior to publication.

Partners for Poems on the Underground include London Underground, which generously supports the programme, and the Arts Council of England, the British Council, London Arts and the Poetry Society.

The programme
A series of different poems are displayed at any given time, ranging from classical and historical works by such well-loved poets as Blake, Shakespeare and Shelley, to contemporary and emerging poets from around the world. The works are displayed three times a year and have proved extremely popular with the travelling public.

Recent booklets, distributed free to the public, include Young Poets on the Underground, London Poems on the Underground, Irish Poems on the Underground, and World Poems on the Underground. Poems on the Underground also publishes anthologies of Poems on the Underground and the most recent edition is Poems on the Underground, A New Edition, Penguin, 2012.

See also
Wall poems in Leiden — public poems in many languages in Leiden, Netherlands
Art on the Underground

References

External links
 Poems on the Underground, Transport for London.

English poetry collections
London Underground in popular culture
Train-related introductions in 1986